Chaap is a traditional folk dance of Baloch people in Balochistan, Pakistan. Chaap dance is performed in circle with a rhythmic clapping.

Most of Balochi dances include clappings (Chaps). Every dance include unique style of clappings with different body movements in the circle. Balochi dances are  performed separately by men and women in big circle while dance together with clappings. Various types of ‘Chaap’ include Balochi Lewa, Hambo and Latti.
Chaap is often performed when many musical instruments exclusive to the Balochi culture, like Nar Sur, Soroz, Naal and Taboora are played.

Some types of Attan also resemble with Balochi Chaap dance.

References

Dance in Pakistan